Lion Gate is a locality in Mumbai, India. The old heritage building of the Naval Dockyard starts from Lion Gate.

References
Heritage Walk in Naval Dockyard, Mumbai from Indian Navy

Neighbourhoods in Mumbai